Norville "Shaggy" Rogers is a fictional character and one of the main characters in the Scooby-Doo franchise. He is generally depicted as cowardly, lazy, an amateur detective, and the long-time best friend of his cowardly dog, Scooby-Doo.

Character description
Shaggy has a characteristic speech pattern marked by his frequent use of the filler word "like" and a pubescent voice that often cracks. In the show, he is the only protagonist with facial hair, which consists of a rough goatee. His signature attire consists of a baggy green V-neck T-shirt, loose maroon or brown bell-bottom pants, and black shoes. In The 13 Ghosts of Scooby-Doo and early made-for-TV films, he wore a red V-neck and blue jeans.
 
Like his dog Scooby, Shaggy is often bribed with Scooby Snacks due to his large appetite and love for food. He and Scooby justify their hunger by insisting that "Being in a constant state of terror makes us constantly hungry!" in Scooby-Doo on Zombie Island. Shaggy's favorite meal is an "extra cheese pizza with pickles," as revealed in the TV film Scooby-Doo! Abracadabra-Doo. In Scooby-Doo! and the Monster of Mexico, it is revealed by Fred that the reason Shaggy eats so much (while maintaining his slender physique) is his "high metabolism". However, in Scooby-Doo: Behind the Scenes, it is stated by Fred that the real reason Shaggy is so skinny is because he is a vegetarian (a reference to Casey Kasem's veganism). The episode "A Clue for Scooby-Doo" from his debut series Scooby-Doo, Where Are You! revealed that his taste for unlikely foods (such as chocolate-covered hot dogs and liverwurst "a la mode") is a consequence of a young Shaggy receiving a garbage disposal unit for his first toy.
 
In the episode "Bedlam in the Big Top", he says he used to run track, and in another episode "What a Night for a Knight" he states that he was a gymnast – both of which explain his uncanny skills in quickly evading villains. He has been shown, in some instances, to be able to run even faster than Scooby, even when the dog is running on all fours. Shaggy is capable of impressive feats of athleticism when he is scared; however, these abilities are usually only used for comedy, with Shaggy only being capable of such feats when panicked. For example, after being scared in Scooby-Doo! Camp Scare, he shakes the iron bars of an old-fashioned jail cell so hard that they collapse.
 
Normally, Shaggy becomes extremely scared when faced with monsters or other frightening situations, usually displaying cowardice to a much greater degree than any other character except for Scooby. This was explained in the Legend of the Phantosaur as a possible type of panic disorder.  However, on occasion, he shows courage when his friends are in serious danger.

Shaggy is the only regular character that appears in every iteration of the franchise; Fred, Daphne, and Velma were temporarily dropped following the introduction of Scrappy-Doo and aside from a brief reintroduction of Daphne in the mid-1980s wouldn't reappear until A Pup Named Scooby-Doo. Scooby-Doo does not appear in the adult animated series Velma premiered due to mandates from Warner Bros. Animation not to feature Scooby in that series due to his marketability towards children as well as a failure for the writers to find an adult take on the character.

Development 
The four teenage lead characters of Scooby-Doo were inspired by four of the main characters from the 1959–63 American sitcom The Many Loves of Dobie Gillis, with Shaggy having been derived from the character Maynard G. Krebs, as played by Bob Denver. Maynard's beatnik-style goatee, general appearance, and use of the word "like" all found their way into the character of Shaggy, with the base personality of the character updated to make him a hippie rather than a beatnik.

Casey Kasem, the first voice actor for Shaggy, said that he originally felt uncomfortable after being assigned to Shaggy. Kasem stated that while he was "hip to what hippies were about", he had never before portrayed a hippie character. Kasem had wanted to voice act for Fred Jones, and Frank Welker had wanted to voice act for Shaggy. Instead, the CBS network assigned Kasem to Shaggy and Welker to Fred. Unsure what the voice of a hippie would sound like, Kasem based his vocal style and mannerisms for Shaggy on those of Dick Crenna's character Walter Denton from the radio/television sitcom Our Miss Brooks.

Kasem stated that as he continued to voice Shaggy, the character evolved. Kasem said that the "voice dynamics" improved and that his laughs increasingly gained quality. He added that Shaggy in 2002 is "more frightened today than he was at the beginning." Kasem convinced the producers that Shaggy should be a vegetarian, like himself, in 2002.

Performers

Radio disc-jockey and actor Casey Kasem created Shaggy's voice. Kasem voiced Shaggy for 28 years, from Scooby-Doo, Where Are You! in 1969 until the Johnny Bravo crossover episode "Bravo Dooby-Doo" in 1997. Starting with What's New, Scooby-Doo? in 2002 and Looney Tunes: Back in Action in 2003, Kasem resumed the role and continued to do so until his retirement in 2009. Billy West voiced the character in the film Scooby-Doo on Zombie Island (1998). Scott Innes (who has also voiced Scooby and Scrappy-Doo) voiced Shaggy in the 1999–2001 direct-to-video films, and in video games until 2009. Innes reprised Shaggy in Harvey Birdman, Attorney at Law and a DirecTV commercial featuring the Scooby gang in 2008. Scott Menville voiced Shaggy in Shaggy & Scooby-Doo Get a Clue!. Upon Casey Kasem's official retirement in 2009, Matthew Lillard (who played Shaggy in the 2002 and 2004 live-action films) took over as the main voice of Shaggy. Lillard also played Shaggy in Robot Chicken and Mad. Nick Palatas played Shaggy in the 2009 and 2010 live-action films. Will Forte voiced the character for the 2020 animated film Scoob! while Iain Armitage voices the child version of Shaggy. An alternative version of Shaggy, an African American school newspaper reporter referred to exclusively as Norville, appears in the HBO series Velma.

All in all, Shaggy has been voiced by:
 Casey Kasem (1969–1997, 2002–2009)
 Duncan Robertson (1977; Peter Pan Records read-along audio books)
 Keith Scott (1981; Pauls commercial)
 Jeff Bergman (Cartoon Network bumpers)
 Tom Kenny (1996; Burger King commercial)
 Billy West (1998; Scooby-Doo on Zombie Island)
 Scott Innes (1998–2009, 2017–2020; Scooby Doo Behind The Scenes, Scooby-Doo! and the Witch's Ghost, The Scooby-Doo Project, Scooby-Doo and the Alien Invaders, Scooby-Doo and the Cyber Chase, Scooby-Doo! Playmobil Mini Mysteries, video games, commercials, theme parks)
 Kenny James (2001; phone message)
 Matt Danner (2003–2009; additional lines, songs, commercials, DVD extras)
 Matthew Lillard (2004–2007, 2010–present; Scooby-Doo 2: Monsters Unleashed: The Video Game, Robot Chicken, Mad, Teen Titans Go!, Supernatural)
 Marc Silk (2004–2009, 2011, 2013, 2015–present; Cartoon Network UK and Ireland bumpers, Boomerang UK and Ireland bumpers, CITV UK and Ireland bumpers, Adidas commercial, Scooby-Doo! and the Pirate Ghost - Live on Stage commercial, Scooby-Doo! Mystery Mansion with Goo Turret commercial, Scooby-Doo! Mystery Mates Mansion Playset and Figures commercial, LEGO Scooby-Doo! commercial, Scooby-Doo! Rumble & Roll Mystery Machine commercial)
 Scott Menville (2006–2008; Shaggy & Scooby-Doo Get a Clue!)
 Seth Green (2008; Robot Chicken)
 Kevin Shinick (2012; Mad)
 Will Forte (2020; Scoob!)
 Iain Armitage (2020–2022; Scoob!, Scoob!: Holiday Haunt (both as a child))
 Sam Richardson (Velma)

And portrayed by:
 Bjorn Thorstad (2001; Scooby-Doo! in Stagefright - Live on Stage)
 Matthew Lillard (2002–2004; Scooby-Doo, Scooby-Doo 2: Monsters Unleashed)
 Cascy Beddow (2004; Scooby-Doo 2: Monsters Unleashed (younger))
 Matthew Bloxham (2009; Scooby-Doo! and the Pirate Ghost - Live on Stage)
 Nick Palatas (2009–2010; Scooby-Doo! The Mystery Begins, Scooby-Doo! Curse of the Lake Monster)
 Garrett Dill (2013; Scooby-Doo Live! Musical Mysteries)
 Danny Stokes (2014; Scooby-Doo Live! The Mystery Of The Pyramid)
 Charlie Haskins (2016; Scooby-Doo Live! Musical Mysteries)

Relatives
Relatives of Shaggy shown during the series include:
 "Mom and Pops": Shaggy's parents. Shaggy's father is a police officer in most incarnations, except for Mystery Incorporated. At one point, Shaggy's parents lived in Plymouth, Massachusetts. In Mystery Incorporated, Shaggy's parents are Colton and Paula Rogers. Casey Kasem (well known for hosting American Top 40) voiced "Pops" from The New Scooby and Scrappy-Doo Show through to Mystery Incorporated. Grey DeLisle voices Paula in Scooby-Doo! Mystery Incorporated. In Velma, his parents are a biracial couple.
 Maggie "Sugie" Rogers: Shaggy's younger sister. Seen in A Pup Named Scooby-Doo.
 Wilfred: Maggie's husband, and Shaggy's brother-in-law.
 Gaggy Rogers: Shaggy's paternal uncle. Voiced by Alan Young.
 Uncle Shagworthy: Shaggy's rich uncle. Not only does he look like his nephew – he has the same appetite and cowardice. He keeps his most precious possession, food, in a secret refrigerator with valuable jewels. Voiced by Casey Kasem.
 Great Uncle Nat (Nathaniel): Shaggy's great-uncle. Voiced by Lennie Weinrib.
 Uncle Beauregard: Shaggy's late uncle, who left his entire fortune and his Southern mansion and plantation to Shaggy in his will. He was referred to in Scooby-Doo Meets the Boo Brothers, although he never made an appearance when he was living. He appeared as a ghost and was one of the villains in the film.
 Fearless Shagaford: Shaggy's uncle, who owns the Fearless Detective Agency (see Fearless Fosdick)
 Uncle Albert Shaggleford: Shaggy's rich uncle, an inventor who has only appeared in Shaggy and Scooby-Doo Get a Clue!. Voiced by Casey Kasem.
 McBaggy Rogers: Shaggy's pilgrim ancestor. He settled in present-day Plymouth, Massachusetts and is the owner of Scooby's ancestor, Yankee-Doodle Doo. McBaggy made an appearance in The New Scooby and Scrappy-Doo Show episode, "Wedding Bell Boos!".
 Betty Lou Shaggbilly: Shaggy's Southern cousin.
 Nathaniel: Shaggy's great-grandfather, whose portrait appeared in the episode "The Loch Ness Mess" of The New Scooby-Doo Movies.
 Benjamin: Shaggy's great-great-grandfather, whose portrait also appeared in "The Loch Ness Mess".
 Matilda: Shaggy's great-great-grandmother, her portrait appeared in "The Loch Ness Mess".
 Tawny Rogers: A Western cousin who appears in Scooby-Doo! Shaggy's Showdown.
 Frederick Rufus Rogers-Dinkley: Shaggy and Velma's son in Scooby Apocalypse.
 Dapper Jack Rogers: Shaggy's Western cowboy ancestor. The town believed he was a criminal until Velma discovers that he was a kind soul, and was framed by the town's sheriff at that time. He appears in flashbacks from his time when Velma explains his true story as a kind–hearted soul.

Background
In most cases, Shaggy is from the fictional town of Coolsville, Ohio. When he was old enough to go to school, he adopted Scooby–Doo from the Knittingham Puppy Farm. Later on, he met Fred Jones, Daphne Blake, and Velma Dinkley. They became friends and they decided to form Mystery Incorporated. According to Scooby-Doo: Behind the Scenes, Shaggy was the one who bought the Mystery Machine and gave it its paint job.

According to Scooby-Doo: Behind the Scenes, Shaggy's old nickname was Buzz (apparently for his buzz cut) until his tenth birthday. Fred says that, contrary to what people believe, Shaggy is not skinny because Scooby is always stealing his food, but rather because he is a vegetarian. But as healthy as Shaggy tries to stay, he has battled unhealthy habits. Velma calculates that he once ate exactly 45% of his body weight. This led to him dieting and starting a new hobby: collecting decorator belt buckles. Shaggy claims to have the largest collection of decorator belt buckles in the world and currently owns 653. He also states that he wears a different belt buckle for every mystery if one pays attention, the joke being that his baggy shirt always hides them.

In Scooby-Doo! Mystery Incorporated, he is from Crystal Cove along with the other members of Mystery Incorporated. His parents' names are Colton and Paula Rogers and appear to be quite well off, living in a mansion. He dates Velma for a short period during the first season.

Shaggy and Scooby make a cameo appearance in the 2003 live-action/animated film Looney Tunes: Back in Action, where Shaggy berates Matthew Lillard over his portrayal of Shaggy in the 2002 live-action film and threatens to "come after" him if he screws up in the sequel.

Shaggy also appears in the 2021 film Space Jam: A New Legacy. His design is the same from the 2020 film, Scoob!

Other appearances

Television series
Shaggy and Scooby-Doo made a non-speaking cameo in Teen Titans Go! episode entitled "I See You" when Cyborg and Beast Boy were rapping. Shaggy later appears in the crossover episode "Cartoon Feud" along with The Scooby Gang, where Control Freak forces them to compete in Family Feud with Matthew Lillard reprising the role of Shaggy.

Shaggy, along with the other 4 members of Mystery inc., make an appearance throughout the 16th episode of the 13th season of Supernatural entitled "Scoobynatural" when the two lead protagonists, Sam Winchester and his brother Dean Winchester, and their accomplice, Castiel, are transported into an episode of Scooby Doo; the Supernatural episode itself is a crossover between the two franchises. Matthew Lillard voices Shaggy in the episode.

Video games
Outside of Scooby-Doo video games, Shaggy appears as a playable character, along with Scooby, in the crossover video game Lego Dimensions. Shaggy's character includes the Mystery Machine. Matthew Lillard reprises his role for the game. Lillard reprises this role in the platform fighting game MultiVersus, in which Shaggy is a playable character.

Internet memes
Within the movie Scooby-Doo! Legend of the Phantosaur, Shaggy is hypnotized into becoming brave when someone says the word "bad". This became the subject of an internet meme in 2017, which began when YouTube user Midya uploaded "Ultra Instinct Shaggy". Said video juxtaposes "Kyūkyoku no Battle", a song composed by Akira Kushida from the Dragon Ball Super soundtrack, with a Legend of the Phantosaur scene where Shaggy single-handedly defeats a biker gang; this is done to parody the Ultra Instinct transformation that Dragon Ball protagonist Goku attains. This later spawned numerous fan art depictions of Shaggy as godlike or even a Dragon Ball character, as well as screenshots of behind-the-scenes interviews from the 2002 film with fake captions of the cast members purportedly attesting to Shaggy's "immense power" on set. The meme also led to a Change.org petition to add Shaggy as a DLC character in Mortal Kombat 11, which caught the attention of both Mortal Kombat series co-creator Ed Boon and Matthew Lillard.
Despite not making it into the game, Shaggy would later appear in the animated film Mortal Kombat Legends: Battle of the Realms, where he appears as a cameo on the Warner Bros. Animation logo, grabbing Scorpion by the neck and pulling him into the Netherrealm. Shaggy's portrayal and abilities in MultiVersus are also derived from the "Ultra Instinct Shaggy" meme.

Controversy
Some viewers of the original Scooby-Doo believed that Shaggy smoked marijuana due to his hippie behavior and constant hunger. In a Newsweek article, Casey Kasem was asked if he had ever observed that subtext in the series, and Kasem responded that "there wasn't anything like that at all", explaining, "[I] guess it's because, I don't know, it was a wholesome show from beginning to end." Kasem was not aware of the fan viewpoint until the interviewer brought it up. The makers of the Scooby-Doo film shot several scenes referencing Shaggy's supposed drug use, but few of those scenes were included in the final film. One scene which made it into the film has a minor character introduce herself to Shaggy as "Mary Jane" (a slang term for marijuana), and he responds, "Like, that is my favorite name." Matthew Lillard, the current voice of Shaggy, does not think he smokes marijuana: "He just seems like that. He acts a little goofy and high, he's lovable and scaredand just happens to have the munchies."

In an online radio interview with host Stu Shostak, series creators Joe Ruby and Ken Spears recalled that they never intended for Shaggy to be a marijuana smoker, and "took umbrage" at the jokes in the 2002 film.

References

External links

 Official Hanna-Barbera website

Television characters introduced in 1969
Fictional amateur detectives
Fictional paranormal investigators
Animated human characters
Comedy film characters
Internet memes introduced in 2017
Male characters in animation
Male characters in film
Male characters in television
Scooby-Doo characters
Teenage characters in film
Teenage characters in television
Hippie movement
Male characters in animated films
Child characters in animated films
Male characters in animated series
Fictional characters who can move at superhuman speeds
Fictional track and field athletes
Fictional vegan and vegetarian characters
Teenage characters in animated films